The 2010 Season of the Supertaça Compal, (1st edition), took place in Luanda, Angola from April 2 to 4, 2010 and was contested by four teams in a single round robin system. Benfica of Portugal was the winner and Miguel Lutonda from Primeiro de Agosto, the tournament's MVP.

2010 Supertaça Compal participants

2010 Supertaça Compal squads

 1º de Agosto vs.  Petro Atlético

 S.L. Benfica vs.  Ovarense

 S.L. Benfica vs.  Petro Atlético

 1º de Agosto vs.  Ovarense

 Petro Atlético vs.  Ovarense

 S.L. Benfica vs.  1º de Agosto

Final standings

Awards

2010 Supertaça Compal MVP
  Miguel Lutonda (Primeiro de Agosto)

2010 Supertaça Compal Top Scorer
  John Waller (Ovarense)

2010 Supertaça Compal Top Rebounder
 

2010 Supertaça Compal Top Assists

See also
COMPAL
Federação Angolana de Basquetebol
Federação Portuguesa de Basquetebol

References

External links
Interbasket Forum Page

2010
2010
2009–10 in Angolan basketball
2009–10 in Portuguese basketball